Anna Jardfelt is the Swedish Ambassador and Permanent Representative to the International Organisations in Geneva.

Early life and education
Jardfelt Melvin holds a law degree with focus on International law and Human rights.

Career
Anna Jardfelt Melvin was previously Ambassador of Sweden to Kenya, Seychelles, Comoros and Permanent Representative to UN Environment and United Nations Human Settlements Programme (UN-HABITAT) from 2017 to 2020, having served as Ambassador to the EU's Political and Security Committee in Brussels between 2014 and 2017.

Prior to these posts, she was the Director of the Swedish Institute of International Affairs (UI) between 2010 and 2014.

Jardfelt Melvin joined the Swedish Foreign Ministry in 1997 and has spent a large part of her career on European Security policy issues, notably as Chief of Staff for the OSCE High Commissioner on National Minorities (2001–2005).

Other activities
 United Nations Institute for Training and Research (UNITAR), Member of the Board of Trustees (since 2021)
 European Leadership Network (ELN), Member

References

Ambassadors of Sweden to Kenya
Ambassadors of Sweden to Seychelles
Ambassadors of Sweden to the Comoros
Swedish women ambassadors
Living people
Year of birth missing (living people)